The 2023 Utah Utes football team will represent the University of Utah as a member of the Pac-12 Conference during the 2022 NCAA Division I FBS football season. The Utes are expected to be led by Kyle Whittingham in his 19th year as Utah's head coach. They play their home games at Rice–Eccles Stadium in Salt Lake City.

Schedule

References

Utah
Utah Utes football seasons
Utah Utes football